Arms trade may refer to:

the global markets for any product of the arms industry
Small arms trade
Illegal arms trade (arms trafficking)

See also
Arms Trade Treaty
Arms control
Nuclear proliferation
Chemical weapon proliferation
Arms race
List of most-produced firearms